Mackay & Whitsundays Magpies Crusaders United Football Club, also known as Magpies Crusaders FC, is an Australian professional association football club based in Mackay, Queensland. The club was established in 2017 as an amalgamation of Magpies Sporting Club and Mackay Crusaders Football Club. 

Magpies Crusaders represents the Mackay & Whitsundays region in the Queensland Premier League competition. In 2020, they withdrew from the NPL during the mid-season hiatus caused by the COVID-19 pandemic in Australia.

In mid-2022  the Mackay & Whitsundays Magpies Crusaders United Football Club (MCU) will not continue to participate in the South East Queensland conference of the Football Queensland Premier League 1 (FQPL 1) beyond 2022.

Club history
Magpies Crusaders made their competitive debut in the 2018 National Premier Leagues Queensland competition, finishing in 11th place in the 14-team competition.

Crusaders made their FFA Cup debut in 2019, defeating Coomera Colts 2–1 on 24 July 2019.

Current squad
2022 season squad. Updated to 12 March 2022

References

External links

National Premier Leagues clubs
Soccer clubs in Queensland
Association football clubs established in 2017
2017 establishments in Australia
Sport in Mackay, Queensland
Whitsunday Region